Balçıkhisar can refer to the following villages in Turkey:

 Balçıkhisar, Alaca
 Balçıkhisar, Araç
 Balçıkhisar, Osmaneli
 Balçıkhisar, Şuhut